The 1981 Currie Cup was the 43rd edition of the Currie Cup, the premier annual domestic rugby union competition in South Africa.

Results

Semi-finals

Final

See also

 Currie Cup

References

1981
1981 in South African rugby union
1981 rugby union tournaments for clubs